Megisthanidae is a family of mites in the order Mesostigmata. It contains 26 currently recognised species, including the largest known Mesostigmata.  There is at least one genus, Megisthanus, in Megisthanidae.

References

External links
 iNaturalist

Mesostigmata
Acari families